Ballantine is a surname of Scottish Gaelic origin. It is first found in Lanarkshire, where the family had been settled since ancient times. The name has also been variously spelled Ballantyne, Bannatyne, Ballanden, and Ballentine.

Origin of the name
In his book The Clans, Septs, and Regiments of the Scottish Highlands (1908), Sir Thomas Innes
Learney states that the original family name was Bannatyne, and was a sept associated with both Clan Campbell and Clan Stuart of Bute.  In the Fourth Edition (1952) of that book, the Bannatyne association with Clan Campbell is stated to have begun in 1538, formalized in a bond signed May 10, 1547, in which the Chief of the MacAmelynes (aka Bannatynes) and Sir John Stuart, ancestor of the Marquis of Bute, engaged to stand by and support each other against all persons except the King and the Earl of Argyll, the latter reservation made so that the Chief of the Bannatynes couldfulfill the conditions of a bond of manrent give to the Early of Argyll, dated April 14, 1538.

The etymology, given in William Arthur's An Etymological Dictionary of Family and Christian Names with an Essay on their Derivation and Import (1857), derives the name from Bal, the name of a deity, and teine, meaning fire, and relating to a place where Belenus, or Bal, was worshiped by the Celts.

Notable people

 Arthur A. Ballantine, American IRS solicitor and Treasury undersecretary in Hoover Administration
Betty Ballantine, American publisher
Carl Ballantine (1917–2009), American magician and actor
Ian Ballantine, American publisher
James Ballantine, Scottish novelist
Patrick J. Ballantine, American politician
Nathan Ballentine, American politician
Pamela Ballantine, Northern Irish television presenter
Peter Ballantine, American brewer
William Ballantine, British lawyer
Julian Ballantine, a fictional character in the TV series Kyle XY
Morley Cowles Ballantine, American newspaper editor, The Durango Herald
Richard Ballantine (1940–2013), American writer
Richard G. Ballantine, American newspaper publisher, the Durango Herald
Sophie Ballantine Hawkins (born 1967), American musician

References

See also 
Ballantine
Bannatyne (name)
Balanchine
Ballentine
Ballantyne
Bellenden
Ballenden
Ballandean, Queensland
Balindean, the spelling used by the Ogilvy-Wedderburn baronets

Scottish Gaelic-language surnames